Lina Zahr Eddine is a Lebanese news presenter and talk show host.

Early life
Lina was born on 12 July 1975 in Mays al Jabal, Nabatieh Governorate, after the beginning of the Lebanese civil war to Shia family. She attended the local Fakhreddine school in Beirut, Lebanon through High School and then got her college degree in Media and Documentation from the Lebanese University.

Career
Lina started her career in early 1997. She worked in NBN, a Lebanese TV as a reporter & radio news presenter. In 2002, she moved to Al Jazeera news TV in Doha, Qatar. In June 2012, she began to work in Al Mayadeen, a pan-Arab television channel in Lebanon. She resigned on 24 November 2019, during the 2019–20 Lebanese protests.

Personal life
Lina was married to a Lebanese businessman, before she got divorced with two kids.

References

1975 births
Living people
Lebanese women journalists
Lebanese Shia Muslims
People from Marjeyoun District
Lebanese University alumni
Al Jazeera people